Occold is a village in Suffolk, England. Occold is located 2 miles south east from the town of Eye, and 8 miles from the town of Diss.

History

References

External links
 http://occold.onesuffolk.net/
www.occold.com

Villages in Suffolk
Mid Suffolk District
Civil parishes in Suffolk